The territorial evolution of the British Empire is considered to have begun with the foundation of the English colonial empire in the late 16th Century.  Since then, many territories around the world have been under the control of the United Kingdom or its predecessor states.
When the Kingdom of Great Britain was formed in 1707 by the union of the Kingdom of Scotland with the Kingdom of England, the latter country's colonial possessions passed to the new state.  Similarly, when Great Britain was united with the Kingdom of Ireland in 1801 to form the United Kingdom, control over its colonial possessions passed to the latter state.  Collectively, these territories are referred to as the British Empire.  Upon much of Ireland gaining independence in 1922 as the Irish Free State, the other territories of the empire remained under the control of the United Kingdom.

From 1714 to 1837, the British throne was held by a series of kings who were also the rulers of the German state of Hanover.  However, this was purely a personal union, with Hanover maintaining its political independence otherwise, and so it is not usually considered to have formed part of the British Empire.

The nature of the territories (and peoples) ruled as part of the British Empire varied enormously.  In legal terms the territories included those formally under the sovereignty of the British monarch (who held the additional title of Emperor (or Empress) of India from 1876 to 1947); various "foreign" territories controlled as protectorates; territories transferred to British administration under the authority of the League of Nations or the United Nations; and miscellaneous other territories, such as the Anglo-Egyptian Sudan, a condominium with Egypt.  No uniform system of government was applied to any of these.

Several countries (dominions) within the British Empire gained independence in stages during the earlier part of the 20th century.  Much of the rest of the empire was dismantled in the twenty years following the end of the Second World War, starting with the independence of India and Pakistan in 1947, and continued until the handover of Hong Kong to China in 1997.   There remain, however, 14 global territories which remain under the jurisdiction and sovereignty of the United Kingdom. 

Many of the former territories of the British Empire are members of the Commonwealth of Nations.  Fourteen of these (known, with the United Kingdom, as the 15 Commonwealth realms) retain the British monarch (currently King Charles III) as head of state. The British monarch is also Head of the Commonwealth, but this is a purely symbolic and personal title; members of the Commonwealth (including the Commonwealth realms) are fully sovereign states.

Governance 
The British Empire refers to the possessions, dominions, and dependencies under the control of the Crown. In addition to the areas formally under the sovereignty of the British monarch, various "foreign" territories were controlled as protectorates; territories transferred to British administration under the authority of the League of Nations or the United Nations; and miscellaneous other territories, such as the condominium of Anglo-Egyptian Sudan. The natures of the administration of the Empire changed both by time and place, and there was no uniform system of government in the Empire.

Colonies 
Colonies were territories that were intended to be places of permanent settlement, providing land for their settlers. The Crown claimed absolute sovereignty over them, although they were not formally part of the United Kingdom itself. Generally, their law was the common law of England together with whatever British Acts of Parliament were also applied to them. Over time, a number of colonies were granted "responsible government", making them largely self-governing.

Crown Colony 

A Crown colony: a type of colonial administration of the English and later the British Empire, whose legislature and administration was controlled by the Crown.

Crown colonies were ruled by a governor appointed by the monarch.  By the middle of the 19th century, the sovereign appointed royal governors on the advice of the Secretary of State for the Colonies. This became the main method of creating and governing colonies. Most Crown colonies, especially the white settler colonies had a bicameral legislature, consisting of an upper house usually called the Legislative council, which members were appointed and served a similar purpose as the British House of Lords. There also existed lower houses which were usually named the Legislative Assembly or House of Assembly. The lower house was usually elected, but suffrage was restricted to free white men only, usually with property ownership restrictions. Since land ownership was widespread, most white men could vote. The governor also often had an Executive Council which had a similar function to the Cabinet in England but was not responsible to the colonial lower house. They held a consultative position, however, and did not serve in administrative offices as cabinet ministers do. Members of the Executive Council were not necessarily members of the lower house but were usually members of the upper house. Later as the white colonies gained more internal responsible government, the lower house began to supersede the (usually unelected) upper house as the colonial legislature, and the position of Premier emerged.

Charter colony 

Charter colony is one of the three classes of colonial government established in the 17th-century English colonies in North America. In a charter colony, the King granted a royal charter to the colonial government establishing the rules under which the colony was to be governed and charter colonies elected their own governors based on rules spelled out in the charter or other colonial legislation.

Proprietary colony 

A number of colonies in the 16th and 17th centuries were granted to a particular individual; these were known as proprietary colonies. Proprietary colonies in America were governed by a Lord Proprietor, who, holding authority by virtue of a royal charter, usually exercised that authority almost as an independent sovereign. Eventually these were converted to Crown colonies.

Chartered company 

A chartered company is an association formed by investors or shareholders for the purpose of trade, exploration and colonization. Chartered companies were usually formed, incorporated and legitimized under a royal charter. This document set out the terms under which the company could trade, defined its boundaries of influence, and described its rights and responsibilities. Groups of investors formed companies to underwrite and profit from the exploration of Africa, India, Asia, the Caribbean and North America, under the patronage of the state. Some companies like the East India Company (the most famous), the Hudson's Bay Company, and the Royal African Company ruled large colonial possessions (especially in India), but the Hudson's Bay Company took control of the Hudson Bay drainage basin in Canada as Rupert's Land, and the Royal African Company started to ship slaves from West Africa to the Americas in the Atlantic slave trade.

Protectorates and protected states 

A protectorate is a territory which is not formally annexed but in which, by treaty, grant or other lawful means, the Crown has power and jurisdiction. A protectorate differs from a "protected state". A protected state is a territory under a foreign ruler which enjoys British protection, over whose foreign affairs she exercises control, but in respect of whose internal affairs she does not exercise jurisdiction.

Dominions 

Dominions were semi-independent polities that were nominally under the Crown, constituting the British Empire and British Commonwealth, beginning in the later part of the 19th century. The dominions had been previously Crown colonies, and some of the colonies had been united to form dominions such as Union of South Africa and Commonwealth of Australia. The Balfour Declaration of 1926 clarified the status of the dominions, recognizing them as "autonomous Communities within the British Empire, equal in status, in no way subordinate one to another in any aspect of their domestic or external affairs, though united by a common allegiance to the Crown, and freely associated as members of the British Commonwealth of Nations." The Statute of Westminster 1931 converted this status into legal reality, making them essentially independent members of what was then called the British Commonwealth. Initially, the Dominions conducted their own trade policy, some limited foreign relations, and had autonomous armed forces, although the British government claimed and exercised the exclusive power to declare wars. However, after the passage of the Statute of Westminster, the language of dependency on the Crown of the United Kingdom ceased, and the Crown itself was no longer referred to as the Crown of any place in particular but simply as "the Crown". Arthur Berriedale Keith, in Speeches and Documents on the British Dominions 1918–1931, stated that "the Dominions are sovereign international States in the sense that the King in respect of each of His Dominions (Newfoundland excepted) is such a State in the eyes of international law". After then, those countries that were previously referred to as "Dominions" became Commonwealth realms where the sovereign reigns no longer as the British monarch, but as monarch of each nation in its own right, and are considered equal to the United Kingdom and one another.

Mandates 

Mandates were forms of territory created after the end of the First World War. A number of German colonies and protectorates and Ottoman provinces were held as mandates by the United Kingdom (Tanganyika, British Cameroons, Togoland, Palestine and Mesopotamia); and its dominions of Australia (New Guinea, Nauru), New Zealand (Western Samoa), and South Africa (South West Africa).  These territories were governed on behalf of the League of Nations for the benefit of their inhabitants.  Most converted to United Nations Trust Territories in 1946.

British Raj 

The British Raj, also called the Indian Empire, was the imperial political structure in the Indian subcontinent between 1858 and 1947, comprising British India (a Crown colony: presidencies and provinces directly governed by the British Crown through the Viceroy and Governor-General of India) and Princely States, governed by Indian rulers, under the suzerainty of the British Crown exercised through the Viceroy and Governor-General of India.

British Overseas territories

Within twenty years of the partition and independence in 1947 of British India (considered to be the most important colonial possession), most of the Empire's territories had achieved full independence.  Today 14 former colonies (since 2002 known as British Overseas Territories) remain under British rule; the term "colonies" is no longer officially used to describe these.

Almost all of the British Overseas Territories are islands (or groups of islands) with a small population; some are in very remote areas of the world.  Of the territories with a permanent population, all have at least some degree of internal self-government, with the United Kingdom retaining responsibility for defence and external relations.

The fourteen British Overseas Territories are:

List of territories that were once a part of the British Empire

Legend

Colour-coding

Africa

North America

Central America and the Caribbean

South America

Asia

Europe

Antarctic Region
(Territories south of 60° S)

Atlantic
(Islands in the Atlantic Ocean)

Indian Ocean
(Islands in the Indian Ocean)

Australasia and the Pacific

Treaties and Acts of Parliament, etc.

This is a listing of the more important treaties, Acts of Parliament, and other legal instruments and events affecting the nature and territorial extent of the British Empire.

 Concessions in China

Additionally, there were more concessions were planned but never completed.

Territorial claims in Antarctica 
United Kingdom 1908–present
 Falkland Islands Dependencies 1908–1962
 British Antarctic Territory 1962–present

New Zealand 1923–present
 Ross Dependency 1923–present
 Australia 1933–present
 Australian Antarctic Territory 1933–present
 Antarctica, South Africa territorial

See also
 Colonialism
 Decolonisation
 Impact of Western European colonialism and colonisation
 Imperialism
 List of British Empire-related topics
 List of countries that gained independence from the United Kingdom
 Scottish colonization of the Americas

References

External links
 UK Overseas Territories
 World Statesmen

British Empire
Territorial evolution